Nemila is a village in the City of Zenica, Bosnia and Herzegovina. It is located on the banks of the River Bosna.

Demographics 
According to the 2013 census, its population was 2,508.

References

Populated places in Zenica